The 2021–22 Kaohsiung Steelers season was the franchise's 1st season, its first season in the P. LEAGUE+ (PLG), its 1st in Kaohsiung City. The Steelers are coached by DeMarcus Berry in his first year as head coach.

On March 19, head coach DeMarcus Berry was fired after a seven straight loss, he was replaced by assistant coach Hung Chi-Chao on an interim basis.

Draft 

The Steelers acquired 2021 first-round draft pick from Formosa Taishin Dreamers in exchange for $500000 cash considerations. The second rounder, Liu Chun-Ting had joined Tainan TSG GhostHawks of the T1 League.

Standings

Roster

Game log

Preseason

Regular season

Player Statistics 
<noinclude>

Regular season

 Reference：

Transactions

Trades

Free Agency

Additions

Subtractions

Awards

End-of-Season Awards

Players of the Month

Players of the Week

References 

Kaohsiung Steelers
Kaohsiung Steelers seasons